Sicily Kanini Kariuki is a Kenyan politician who has been serving as the Cabinet Secretary for Water, Sanitation and Irrigation, since 20 January 2020. She previously served as the Cabinet Secretary for Health. Previously, she was the Cabinet Secretary for Public Service, Youth and Gender Affairs, from December 2015 until January 2018.

Early life and education
Sicily Kanini Kariuki was born in Kangaru Village, Manyatta constituency, in present-day Embu County in Kenya.

Kariuki has a bachelor's degree, from the University of Nairobi. Her Master of Business Administration (MBA) degree, was awarded by the Eastern and Southern African Management Institute (ESAMI) in conjunction with Maastricht School of Management in the Netherlands. She also has a Postgraduate Diploma in Law and Regulation, from Michigan State University in the United States.

Career before politics
Kariuki enjoyed a wide-ranging career in the business world, including as an officer of the Kenya Investment Authority, and as chief executive officer of Fresh Produce Exporters Association of Kenya.

Kariuki then served as the Managing Director and CEO of "Tea Board of Kenya". In 2012, while at the helm of the tea board, the tea industry rose to become the top earner of foreign exchange in the country, accounting for KSh130 billion (approx. US$1.3 billion), in 2012. She also served as the Principal Secretary, in the Department of Agriculture, in the Kenyan Ministry of Agriculture, Livestock and Fisheries.

Political career
In December 2015, Kariuki was appointed as the Cabinet Secretary for Public Service, Youth and Gender Affairs. She served in that capacity until January 2018, when she was appointed Cabinet Secretary for Health.

In her capacity as minister, Kariuki was appointed by WHO Director-General Tedros Adhanom Ghebreyesus to serve on the Independent High-level Commission on Non-Communicable Diseases from 2018 until 2019.

See also
Raychelle Omamo
Judy Wakhungu
Phyllis Kandie

References

External links
Sicily Kariuki: Take it from me, life is like a steeplechase As at 19 August 2016.
Kenyans react to a photo of CS Sicily Kariuki's bodyguard carrying her handbag As of 15 August 2017.

Living people
University of Nairobi alumni
Michigan State University alumni
21st-century Kenyan women politicians
21st-century Kenyan politicians
Year of birth missing (living people)
Eastern and Southern African Management Institute alumni
Maastricht University alumni